Togacantha is a genus of orb-weaver spiders found in Africa. It is monotypic and contains the single species Togacantha nordviei. It was first described as a subgenus of Gasteracantha by Friedrich Dahl in 1914, and was later elevated to genus status. Only the female was known until a male was found and described in 1982.

References

Araneidae
Monotypic Araneomorphae genera
Spiders of Africa
Taxa named by Friedrich Dahl